Robert Hawthorne VC (1822 – 2 February 1879) born in Maghera, County Londonderry was an Irish recipient of the Victoria Cross (VC), the highest and most prestigious award for gallantry in the face of the enemy that can be awarded to British and Commonwealth forces.

Life
He was approximately 35 years old, and a Bugler in the 52nd (Oxfordshire) Regiment of Foot (later the Oxfordshire and Buckinghamshire Light Infantry), British Army during the Indian Mutiny. On 14 September 1857 he was in a column tasked with forcing an entry into Delhi through the Kashmiri Gate on its northern wall. This had first to be blown up. Hawthorne was awarded the VC on the following commendation:

Bugler Hawthorne, who accompanied the explosion party, not only performed the dangerous duty on which he was employed, but previously attached himself to Lieutenant Salkeld, of the Engineers, when dangerously wounded, bound up his wounds under a heavy musketry fire, and had him removed without further injury". (General Order of Major-General Sir Archdale Wilson, Bart., K.C.B., dated Head Quarters, Delhi City, 21 September 1857.)

Death
He died in Manchester, Lancashire on 2 February 1879. He is buried in Ardwick Cemetery. His grave is unmarked since headstones in this cemetery were removed in the 1950s.

Further information
His Victoria Cross is displayed at the Royal Green Jackets (Rifles) Museum, Winchester, Hampshire, England.

References

Further reading
The Register of the Victoria Cross (1981, 1988 and 1997)

Ireland's VCs  (Dept of Economic Development, 1995)
Monuments to Courage (David Harvey, 1999)
Irish Winners of the Victoria Cross (Richard Doherty & David Truesdale, 2000)

External links
Location of grave and VC medal (Manchester)

1822 births
1872 deaths
19th-century Irish people
Irish soldiers in the British Army
52nd Regiment of Foot soldiers
Irish recipients of the Victoria Cross
Indian Rebellion of 1857 recipients of the Victoria Cross
People from Maghera
Military personnel from County Londonderry
British military musicians
British Army recipients of the Victoria Cross
Burials in Greater Manchester